The Mark 24 nuclear bomb was an American thermonuclear bomb design, based on the third American thermonuclear bomb test, Castle Yankee.  The Mark 24 bomb was tied as the largest weight and size nuclear bomb ever deployed by the United States, with the same size and weight as the Mark 17 nuclear bomb which used a very similar design concept but unenriched Lithium.

The Castle Yankee thermonuclear test was the first bomb to use enriched Lithium-6 isotope, up to perhaps 40% enrichment (the earlier Castle Bravo test had used the same enriched lithium combination but was not weaponised i.e. was not built as a deployable bomb).  The device tested was called the Runt II design; it was reportedly very similar to the Runt design tested in Castle Romeo, other than the enrichment level.

Castle Yankee had a demonstrated yield of 13.5 megatons.  The yield for the weaponized Mark 24 was predicted to be 10–15 megatons.

The EC24 bomb was a limited production run of the Castle Yankee test device, with 10 produced and stockpiled through 1954. The EC24 was a purely free-fall bomb design.

Design
It was in service between 1954 and 1956, with a total of 105 units produced. The Mark 24 included a  parachute to slow its descent.

The bomb used manual in-flight insertion (IFI) that required a crewmember to crank a handle that was inserted into a hole in the nose of the bomb. This process inserted the weapon's pit into the implosion assembly.

Survivors
A Mark 24 casing is on display in the Castle Air Museum in Atwater, CA.

See also
 List of nuclear weapons
 Nuclear weapon design
 Teller-Ulam design
 Mark 17 nuclear bomb
 Castle Yankee

References

 Allbombs.html list of all US nuclear warheads at nuclearweaponarchive.org
 Chuck Hansen, U. S. Nuclear Weapons: The Secret History (Arlington: AeroFax, 1988)

Cold War aerial bombs of the United States
Nuclear bombs of the United States
Military equipment introduced in the 1950s